Beatification (from Latin beatus, "blessed" and facere, "to make”) is a recognition accorded by the Catholic Church of a deceased person's entrance into Heaven and capacity to intercede on behalf of individuals who pray in their name. Beati is the plural form, referring to those who have undergone the process of beatification; they possess the title of "Blessed"  (abbreviation "Bl.") before their names and are often referred to in English as "a Blessed" or, plurally, "Blesseds".

History 
Local bishops had the power of beatifying until 1634, when Pope Urban VIII, in the apostolic constitution Cœlestis Jerusalem of 6 July, reserved the power of beatifying to the Holy See.

Since the reforms of 1983, as a rule, one miracle must be confirmed to have taken place through the intercession of the person to be beatified. Miracles are almost always unexplainable medical healings, and are scientifically investigated by commissions comprising physicians and theologians.

The requirement of a miracle for beatification is waived in the case of someone whose martyrdom is formally declared by the Church.

The feast day for a beatified person is not universal, but is celebrated only by territories, religious institutes, or communities in which the person receives particular veneration. For instance, Saint Kateri Tekakwitha was especially honored in the United States and Canada during her time as Blessed. John Duns Scotus was honored among the Franciscans, in the Archdiocese of Cologne and other places. Similarly, veneration of Blessed Chiara Badano is particular to the Focolare movement.

The blessed, elected by popular acclamation (the vox populi) enjoyed only local veneration. While the procedure of canonization was taken in hand from the twelfth century by the papacy in Rome, that of beatification continued on a local scale until the thirteenth century before settling at the Council of Trent, which reserved to the pope the right to say who could be venerated.

Practices under the popes 
Pope John Paul II (1978–2005) markedly changed previous Catholic practice of beatification. By October 2004, he had beatified 1,340 people, more than the sum of all of his predecessors since Pope Sixtus V (1585–1590), who established a beatification procedure similar to that used today.

John Paul II's successor, Pope Benedict XVI, personally celebrated the Beatification Mass for his predecessor at St. Peter's Basilica, on the Second Sunday of Easter, or Divine Mercy Sunday, on 1 May 2011, an event that drew more than one million people.

See also 

 Canonization (delineates the process of beatification)
 Chronological list of saints and blesseds
 List of saints
 List of venerated Catholics
 List of Servants of God
 List of beatified people
 List of people beatified by Pope Francis
List of people beatified by Pope Benedict XVI
 List of people beatified by Pope John Paul II

References

Citations

Sources 

 
 
 De Meester, A., J.C.D., Juris Canonici et Juris Canonico-Civilis Compendium Nova Editio, Tomus Tertius, Pars Secunda (Brugis: Desclée de Brouwer et Sii, 1928)
 Saunders, Rev. William (2003). "The Process of Becoming a Saint". Reprinted from Arlington Catholic Herald. Via Catholic Education Resource Center. catholiceducation.org.
 Vatican website, with new procedures

External links 
 List of all Blesseds in the Catholic Church  by GCatholic.org.

 
 
Catholic theology and doctrine
Posthumous recognitions
Canonization